The 1973–74 Serie A season was won by Lazio.

Teams
Genoa, Cesena and Foggia had been promoted from Serie B while Atalanta, Ternana and Palermo was relegated to Serie B.

Final classification

Results

Top goalscorers

References and sources
Almanacco Illustrato del Calcio – La Storia 1898–2004, Panini Edizioni, Modena, September 2005

External links
  – All results on RSSSF website.

1973-74
Italy
1